Deresse Mekonnen Tsigu (Amharic: ደረሠ መኮንነን; born 20 October 1987) is an Ethiopian middle distance runner, who specializes in the 1500 metres. He is a two-time World Indoor champion and was the silver medallist at the 2009 World Championships. He represented Ethiopia in the event at the 2008 Beijing Olympics and holds the Ethiopian record for the mile run.

Running career
Born in Sheno, Oromia Region, his first major international competition was the 2007 World Championships in Osaka where he finished 11th in the heats. His first major win came at the 2008 World Indoor Championships in Valencia at the 1500 m, where he was initially disqualified for a lane violation after winning the race. However, the Ethiopian Athletics Federation made an appeal, and the disqualification was reversed, giving Mekonnen the gold medal. He came third in the Dream Mile at the Bislett Games in June with an Ethiopian record of 3:49.72 for the distance. He gained selection for the 2008 Beijing Olympics, but he just missed a place in the 1500 m final as he was eliminated in the semi-finals.

The following year, he became the first Ethiopian to win the Dream Mile and he further improved his national mark in the process, running 3:48.95 minutes. He also improved his 1500 m best to 3:32.18 minutes at the Herculis meeting in Monaco. He entered the 2009 World Championships in Athletics in Berlin and reached the 1500 m final. He won the silver medal behind Yusuf Saad Kamel, becoming Ethiopia's first medallist in the event at the World Championships. He competed in both the 1500 m and 3000 m at the season-closer 2009 IAAF World Athletics Final, but failed to medal in either event.

His focus of the 2010 season was to retain his world title at the 2010 IAAF World Indoor Championships. In the buildup to the competition, he ran at the Aviva Indoor Grand Prix in Birmingham and improved his 1500 m indoor best to 3:33.10 – fifth on the all-time rankings. At the World Indoor Championships Mekonnen held off a challenge from Abdalaati Iguider and became the first athlete since Hicham El Guerrouj to win back-to-back 1500 m titles indoors. A stomach problem side-lined him for six months but on his return in January 2011 he broke Bernard Lagat's six-year-long win streak in the Wanamaker Mile at the Millrose Games.

Personal bests
Outdoors
1500 metres - 3:32.18 (2009)
Mile - 3:48.95 (2009) - Ethiopian Record
3000 metres - 7:32.93 (2009)
5000 metres - 13:07.75 (2009)
Indoors
1500 metres - 3:33.10 (2010) - #5 All-Time
Mile - 3:54.11 (2009)

Achievements

References

External links

Living people
1987 births
Ethiopian male middle-distance runners
Athletes (track and field) at the 2008 Summer Olympics
Olympic athletes of Ethiopia
Sportspeople from Oromia Region
World Athletics Championships medalists
World Athletics Indoor Championships winners
20th-century Ethiopian people
21st-century Ethiopian people